James Michael Hettes (born June 9, 1987) is a retired American mixed martial artist who competed as a featherweight in the Ultimate Fighting Championship.

Background
Hettes is a 2-time Keystone State Games Judo Gold Medalist and earned the nickname "Judo Jim" at Greg Jackson's Camp in Albuquerque, NM. Hettes started boxing at age 14 and started training in Brazilian Jiu-Jitsu at the age of 16 and is currently the head instructor at Northeastern Ju-Jitsu in Swoyersville, Pennsylvania. Hettes attended Luzerne County Community College for Criminal Justice.

Ultimate Fighting Championship
Hettes was originally expected to make his UFC debut in December 2010 as part of The Ultimate Fighter: Team GSP vs. Team Koscheck Finale card; Hettes turned the offer down due to prior engagements with another promotion. On July 16, 2011, Hettes officially signed with the UFC after winning the MMA Melee - MASS Featherweight Championship Belt.

As a late replacement to an injured Leonard Garcia. Hettes made his promotional debut on August 14, 2011 against Alex Caceres on 10 days notice. He won via submission (rear naked choke) at 3:12 of round 2.

Hettes defeated Nam Phan on December 30, 2011 at UFC 141. Hettes used his superior judo to take Phan down repeatedly, and also utilized excellent control on the ground. He landed a great deal of unanswered ground and pound and threatened with submissions throughout, taking a dominant unanimous decision (30-25, 30-25, 30-26).

Hettes was expected to face Steven Siler on June 22, 2012 at UFC on FX 4. However, Hettes was forced out of the bout with an injury and replaced by promotional newcomer Joey Gambino.

Hettes faced Marcus Brimage on September 22, 2012 at UFC 152. He lost the fight via unanimous decision, his first professional loss.

Hettes was expected to face Steven Siler on April 27, 2013 at UFC 159.  However, Hettes was forced to pull out of the bout with an injury and replaced by Kurt Holobaugh.

After 13 months away, Hettes returned to the UFC in October 2013. He was expected to face Mike Wilkinson on October 26, 2013 at UFC Fight Night 30. However, Wilkinson pulled out of the bout in the week leading up the bout and was replaced by newcomer Robert Whiteford. Hettes won the fight via submission in the second round.

Hettes next faced Dennis Bermudez on March 15, 2014 at UFC 171. He lost the bout via TKO due to strike in the third round.

Hettes was expected to face Diego Brandão on January 31, 2015 at UFC 183.  However, the fight was canceled right before the event started, as Hettes passed out backstage. He was taken to a local hospital for precautionary reasons.  Subsequently, the bout with Brandão was rescheduled for April 18, 2015 at UFC on Fox 15. During a back-and-forth first round, an elbow strike from Brandão opened up Hettes' cauliflower ear.  The attending doctor stopped the fight between the first and second rounds, resulting in a TKO loss for Hettes.

Hettes was expected to face Charles Rosa on January 17, 2016 at UFC Fight Night 81, but pulled out of the fight due to injury.

Championships and accomplishments

Mixed martial arts
Martial Arts Super Sport
MASS Featherweight Championship (One time)
Pennsylvania Cage Fight Series
Pennsylvania Cage Fight Series Featherweight Championship (One time)

Mixed martial arts record

|- 
|Loss
|align=center|11–3
|Diego Brandão
|TKO (doctor stoppage)
|UFC on Fox: Machida vs. Rockhold 
|
|align=center|1
|align=center|5:00
|Newark, New Jersey, United States
|
|-
|Loss
|align=center|11–2
|Dennis Bermudez
|TKO (punches and knee)
|UFC 171
|
|align=center|3
|align=center|2:57
|Dallas, Texas, United States
|
|-
|Win
|align=center|11–1
|Robert Whiteford
|Technical Submission (triangle choke)
|UFC Fight Night: Machida vs. Munoz
|
|align=center|2
|align=center|2:17
|Manchester, England
|
|-
|Loss
|align=center|10–1
|Marcus Brimage
|Decision (unanimous)
|UFC 152
|
|align=center|3
|align=center|5:00
|Toronto, Ontario, Canada
|
|-
|Win
|align=center|10–0
|Nam Phan
|Decision (unanimous)
|UFC 141
|
|align=center|3
|align=center|5:00
|Las Vegas, Nevada, United States
|
|-
|Win
|align=center|9–0
|Alex Caceres
|Submission (rear-naked choke)
|UFC Live: Hardy vs. Lytle
|
|align=center|2
|align=center|3:12
|Milwaukee, Wisconsin, United States
|
|-
|Win
|align=center|8–0
|Jacob Kirwan
|Submission (triangle choke)
|MASS: Inauguration
|
|align=center|2
|align=center|3:58
|Wilkes-Barre, Pennsylvania, United States
|Won the MASS Featherweight Championship
|-
|Win
|align=center|7–0
|George Sheppard
|Submission (rear-naked choke)
|Cage Fight 6
|
|align=center|2
|align=center|3:05
|Scranton, Pennsylvania, United States
|Catchweight (152 lbs) bout.
|-
|Win
|align=center|6–0
|Dwayne Shelton
|Submission (guillotine choke)
|Cage Fight 5
|
|align=center|1
|align=center|0:49
|Scranton, Pennsylvania, United States
|Won the Pennsylvania CFS Featherweight Championship
|-
|Win
|align=center|5–0
|James Jones
|Submission (rear-naked choke)
|Shogun Fights 2
|
|align=center|1
|align=center|0:28
|Baltimore, Maryland, United States
|
|-
|Win
|align=center|4–0
|Jay Haas
|Submission (heel hook)
|Cage Fight 2
|
|align=center|1
|align=center|0:47
|Scranton, Pennsylvania, United States
|
|-
|Win
|align=center|3–0
|Steven Baker
|Submission (armbar)
|Shogun Fights
|
|align=center|1
|align=center|1:25
|Baltimore, Maryland, United States
|
|-
|Win
|align=center|2–0
|Nick Gentile
|Submission (triangle choke)
|Premier Cage Fighting
|
|align=center|1
|align=center|3:11
|Hamburg, Pennsylvania, United States
|
|-
|Win
|align=center|1–0
|Bobby Gorham
|Submission (rear-naked choke)
|Cage Fight 1
|
|align=center|1
|align=center|1:51
|Scranton, Pennsylvania, United States
|

See also
 List of current UFC fighters
 List of male mixed martial artists

References

External links
 
  

1987 births
American male mixed martial artists
Mixed martial artists from Pennsylvania
Featherweight mixed martial artists
Mixed martial artists utilizing boxing
Mixed martial artists utilizing judo
Mixed martial artists utilizing Brazilian jiu-jitsu
People from Kingston, Pennsylvania
People from Swoyersville, Pennsylvania
People from Luzerne County, Pennsylvania
Ultimate Fighting Championship male fighters
American male judoka
American practitioners of Brazilian jiu-jitsu
Living people